Saint Clair (also spelled St. Clair, St Clair or even Sinclair, and sometimes also pronounced that way) may refer to:

Saints
 Clair of Nantes (3rd century), first bishop of Nantes, the Saint named Clair
 Clare of Assisi (1194–1253), source name for many "St. Clair" place names

Places

Australia
St Clair, South Australia, a newer suburb of Adelaide
St Clair, New South Wales, a suburb of Sydney
Lake St Clair (Tasmania), a lake in the Central Highlands area of Tasmania

Canada
 St. Clair, Ontario
 St. Clair Beach, Ontario
 St. Clair Carhouse, a former streetcar facility located in Toronto
 St. Clair River
 St. Clair station, a subway station located in Toronto
 St. Clair West station, another subway station located in Toronto
 St. Clair Avenue, located in Toronto
 St. Clair College, located in Southwestern Ontario
 St. Clair National Wildlife Area, located in Southwestern Ontario

France
 Hérouville-Saint-Clair, in the Calvados département
 Saint-Clair, Ardèche
 Saint-Clair, Lot
 Saint-Clair, Tarn-et-Garonne
 Saint-Clair, Vienne
 Saint-Clair-d'Arcey, in the Eure département 
 Saint-Clair-de-Halouze, in the Orne département
 Saint-Clair-de-la-Tour, in the Isère département 
 Saint-Clair-du-Rhône, in the Isère département
 Saint-Clair-sur-Epte, in the Val-d'Oise département 
 Saint-Clair-sur-Galaure, in the Isère département 
 Saint-Clair-sur-l'Elle, in the Manche département 
 Saint-Clair-sur-les-Monts, in the Seine-Maritime département
 Saint-Clair, a district of the commune of Le Lavandou, in the Var département

United States
 St. Clair County, Alabama
 Saint Clair, Georgia
 St. Clair County, Illinois
 St. Clair, Michigan
 St. Clair Shores, Michigan
 St. Clair, Minnesota
 Saint Clair, Missouri
 St. Clair County, Missouri
 St. Clair, Pennsylvania, in Schuylkill County
 St. Clair, Blair County, Pennsylvania
 St. Clair (Pittsburgh), Pennsylvania, a neighborhood of Pittsburgh
 St. Clair Village, of the Pittsburgh Housing Authority
 St. Clair Township (disambiguation)
 Upper St. Clair Township, Allegheny County, Pennsylvania
 Saint Clair, Tennessee

Other places
 St Clair, Port of Spain, Trinidad and Tobago
 St Clair, New Zealand, a suburb of Dunedin

People

Surnamed
 Arthur St. Clair (1737–1818), U.S. revolutionary general
 Blair St. Clair (born 1995), American drag queen
 Bob St. Clair (1931–2015), sportsman
 Earl St. Clair, American musician
 Gairy St. Clair (born 1975), Australian boxer
 Isla St Clair (born 1952), singer
 James D. St. Clair (1920–2001), American lawyer
 James St Clair-Erskine, 2nd Earl of Rosslyn (1762–1837), a Scottish soldier and politician
 Jean Helen St. Clair Campbell, Girl Guide Chief Commissioner for the British Commonwealth
 Jeffrey St. Clair (born 1959), editor
 Lindi St Clair (born 1952), prostitute and political campaigner
 Malcolm St. Clair (filmmaker) (1897–1952), film director, writer, producer, and actor
 Malcolm St Clair (politician) (1927–2004), British Conservative Party politician
 Margaret St. Clair (1911–1995), writer
 Matthew St. Clair, American environmentalist
 Richard St. Clair (born 1946), American composer and poet
 Sally St. Clair (died 1782), a woman soldier in the American Revolution
 Stuart St. Clair (born 1949), Australian lobbyist and politician
 Terry St Clair (born 1951), British singer-songwriter
 Veronica St. Clair (born 1994), American Actress.
 William Saint-Clair (disambiguation)

Given named
 St Clair Leacock, member of parliament in Saint Vincent and the Grenadines
 St. Clair Lee (1944–2011), singer and member of The Hues Corporation
 St. Clair McKelway (1905–1980), writer and editor for The New Yorker magazine
 St. Clair Smith (1889–1988), Justice of the South Dakota Supreme Court
 Saint Clair Cemin (born 1951), Brazilian sculptor

Other
 Saint-Clair (grape), another name for the French wine grape Saint-Pierre Doré
 SS Ste. Claire
 St. Clair, a predecessor of the Lake Cities (Amtrak train)
 St. Clair Entertainment Group, a discount music distributor
 St. Clair's Falls
 St. Clair Winery

See also
Saint Clare (disambiguation)
Santa Clara (disambiguation) (Spanish and Portuguese)
St. Clair County (disambiguation)
St. Claire (disambiguation)
Sinclair (disambiguation)
Clair (disambiguation)